JuffEd is a text editor for programmers and advanced users. It is designed to be a simple and lightweight cross-platform text editor. It uses Qt4 toolkit and QScintilla editing component (Qt port of Scintilla editing component).

Features
 UTF-8 compatible
 Syntax highlighting for many languages (Ada, Assembly Language, Batch, Bash, C/C++, C#, CSS, D, diff, Fortran, Haskell, HTML, IDL, Java, JavaScript, Lisp Lua, Makefiles, Pascal, Perl, Python, PHP, Ruby, SQL, TeX, XML)
 Plaintext- and regexp-based text search/replacement
 Line numbers
 Text wrapping
 Autocomplete
 Auto-indent
 Bracket matching
 Current line highlighting
 Saving/restoring of named sessions
 Line markers
 Character encoding selection
 Customizable GUI
 Brazilian Portuguese, Chinese (simplified), Czech, English, French, German, Polish, Russian, and Spanish translations

See also
List of text editors
Scintilla (editing component)

References

External links
 

Free software projects
Free software programmed in C++
Free text editors
Free HTML editors
Linux text editors
Windows text editors
Software using the GPL license